is a Japanese actor. He is represented with Tristone Entertainment Inc.

Biography

His hobbies are playing guitar, watching films and listening to music.

Mamiya's favourite actress is Kumiko Asō.

Filmography

TV dramas

Variety

Films

Internet

Stage

Music videos

Dubbing

Awards

References

External links
 – Official profile by his affiliated office 
 

Japanese television personalities
Japanese male stage actors
Male actors from Yokohama
1993 births
Living people
Japanese male television actors
Japanese male film actors
21st-century Japanese male actors